Askia Mohammad Benkan, also Askiya Muhammad Bonkana, was the third ruler of the Songhai Empire from 1531 to 1537.

Mohammad Benkan assumed power after Askiya Musa (son of Askia Mohammad I) was assassinated. Musa was assassinated in the village of Mansura on Wed 12 April 1531, and on that same day,  Mohammad Benkan became Askia:

Shocked by Musa's ruthless actions to eliminate rivals, his brothers conspired together and killed him. It was during this chaos that Benkan, the Kurmina-fari (also Kan-fari, both meaning military captain of Kurmina with the Kurmina-fari being the highest-ranking captain in the empire) and son of Umar Komadiakha (brother of Askia Mohammad), seized control of the throne despite opposition from Alu (one of the sons of Askia Mohammad) and took the position of Askia.

To secure his position Benkan then banished Askia Mohammad, his paternal uncle to the island of Kangaba, in the River Niger to the west of Gao. Musa who had previously dethroned Askia Mohammad (his father), had allowed him continued residence in Gao. Benkan appointed his brother Uthman ibn Amar to the position as Kurmina-fari. The Tarikh al-Sudan contains this description of his court:

Askiya Muhammad Bonkana furbished the court splendidly, enlarging it, adorning it, and embellishing it with more courtiers than ever before. He supplied sumptuous garments, invented different types of musical instruments (versions of the trumpet-like fotorifo, and deep sounding gabtanda drum), and sponsored many male and female singers. He gave out abundant largesse and benefactions. During his reign divine favours were bestowed, doors were opened, and blessings poured forth.

Benkan tried to reverse his uncle's policy of relying on the towns, preferring instead to gather support from the peasants. However, after a series of military failures, most notably suffering a terrible defeat at the hands of Muhammadu Kanta, the Sarkin of Kebbi. Muhammad Benkan was himself deposed in 1537, and was succeeded by Askiya Isma'il son of Askiya al-hajj Muhammad. Muhammad Bonkana went blind before he died in around 1559.

Kanta was once the Leka-fari and a Barde, one of the great captains of Askia Mohammed. However, Kanta had revolted against Askia and with his followers moved into the territory of the Kebbawa taking control and establishing the independent state of Kebbi.

Notes

References
.
. Also available from Aluka but requires subscription.

People of the Songhai Empire
16th-century monarchs in Africa